FC Nistru Otaci was a Moldovan football club based in Otaci, Moldova. The club was founded on 17 August 1953. It was dissolved in 2017.

History
During the 1999–2000 season, the club played as FC Nistru-Unisport Otaci due to Nistru being expelled in the summer of 1999. The club merged with Unisport Chişinău, which allowed Nistru to use Unisport's top flight position to play. However, this merger was canceled in 2000, sending Unisport back down to the Divizia A.

In June 2020, club president Vasile Traghira died.

Honours

League
Moldovan National Division
Runners-up (3): 2001–02, 2003–04, 2004–05

Moldovan "A" Division
Winners (1): 1992

Cup
Moldovan Cup
Winners (1): 2004–05
Runners-up (8): 1993–94, 1996–97, 2000–01, 2001–02, 2002–03, 2005–06, 2006–07, 2007–08

Moldovan Super Cup
Runners-up (1): 2005

European record

List of seasons

Managers
 Alexandru Spiridon (2002–2004)
 Alexandru Mațiura (200? – May 2006)
 Mykola Kopystyanskyi (200? – Jun 2007)
 Valeri Zazdravnykh (Jun 2007 – Sep 2007)
 Nicolae Bunea (Sep 2007 – May 2008)
 Lilian Popescu (May 2008 – Oct 2012)
 Oleksandr Holokolosov (Jan 2013 – Feb 2013)
 Yuriy Malyhin  (Feb 2013 – Mar 2013)
 Volodymyr Lyutyi (Mar 2013 – Apr 2013)
 Vitali Mostovoi (Apr 2013 – ?)

See also
 2009–10 FC Nistru season

References

External links
 Profile at DiviziaNationala.com 

 
FC Nistru Otaci
2017 disestablishments in Moldova
Football clubs in the Moldavian Soviet Socialist Republic
Association football clubs established in 1953
Association football clubs disestablished in 2017
Defunct football clubs in Moldova